The Kissariat al-Kifah or Kissaria is the historic central bazaar of Fes el-Bali, the historic old city of Fez, Morocco. It is located between the Zawiya of Moulay Idris II and the Qarawiyyin Mosque.

The Kissaria (a term also used in other parts of the Islamic world and sometimes transliterated from Arabic as qaysariyya) is interconnected with the Souq al-Attarine and consists of a close network of lanes and alleys which are filled with hundreds of shops. It is only one part of a larger commercial district and of a network of souqs (markets) across the city, but was traditionally the most prestigious and most central commercial complex, where the most luxurious goods were sold. A number of funduqs (merchant inns and warehouses) were also found nearby, such as the Funduq al-Shamma'in. This arrangement of a planned bazaar at heart of the city, near its most important religious and civic monuments, was typical of many major cities in the Islamic world.

The bazaar has been established here since the early Idrisid period of the city (9th-10th centuries). However, its streets and houses were rebuilt at least once after the double devastation of a fire in 1324 and a flood in 1325, and then again in the 1920s following another fire, at which point many of the structures were rebuilt in concrete. The most recent renovations, in 2016 and 2017, replaced the street roofs with new wooden roofs, made various repairs and practical improvements, and added tile decoration along the lower walls.

References 

Fez, Morocco
Bazaars
Souqs
Architecture in Morocco